New Zealand competed at the 2011 Commonwealth Youth Games in Isle of Man from 7 to 13 September 2011. The New Zealand Olympic Committee selected 29 competitors. New Zealand won six gold medals, six silver medals and eight bronze medals. They finished fourth overall.

References

Nations at the 2011 Commonwealth Youth Games
Commonwealth Youth Games
2011 Commonwealth Youth Games